David Max Freedman (born 1965) is an American writer, producer and director. He is well known as the co creator of the British animated adult comedy television series Aaagh! It's the Mr. Hell Show! for the BBC.

Early life
Freedman was born in Plattsburgh, New York and went to The School of Visual Arts in New York City. He now lives in the UK. Freedman worked for over 9 years in a writing partnership with Alan Gilbey. They developed and co-created a few cult cartoon classics including Foxbusters, Bounty Hamster and the multi award-winning Aaagh! It's the Mr. Hell Show! which was co-produced at Peafur Productions with Barry Baker, Ben Bowen, Baljeet Rai and  Jeff "Swampy" Marsh co-creator of Phineas & Ferb.

Contributed to The Danny Baker Show for 10 episodes,

Directed Lucy Porter 3 webisodes 'Lucy Loves you' for the now defunct ComedyDemon.com, with the highest watched video, 'Sex' before the website closed

Credits

Writer
 Unstable (pre-production)
 When Marnie Was There - screenplay adaptation: English version
 The Magic Snowflake - screenplay - dialogue
 Sokator-442 - TV Movie
 Bounty Hamster - co-creator with Alan Gilbey with Silver Fox Films
 Aaagh! It's the Mr. Hell Show based on an original character by Hugh MacLeod of gapingvoid.com - Co-creator with Alan Gilbey
 So Many Santas - TV Short
 Foxbusters - co-developer and writer for Cosgrove Hall Films
 The First Snow of Winter - short - script
 Rex the Runt - co-developer and co-writer with Alan Gilbey and Richard Golly Goleszowski for Aardman Animations
 Dennis the Menace - writer - TV Series - three episodes: Monster Menace, Snowbound, Adventures in Dennis Sitting for Collingwood O'Hare, DC Thomson and HIT Entertainment
 The Old Lady and the Pigeons - short - dialogue
 The Danny Baker Show - TV Series - additional material - 10 episodes
 Pirates - TV Series
 Only Yesterday - English version
 Ronja the Robber's Daughter - English dub

Director
 Groove High - series director for Disney Channel (UK and Ireland)
 King Arthur's Disasters - season 2 - series director for CITV
 Ronja the Robber's Daughter - English dub

Producer
 Legend of the Dragon - producer  for BKN
 Bounty Hamster - co-creator with Alan Gilbey with Silver Fox Films
 Aaagh! It's the Mr. Hell Show! based on an original character by Hugh MacLeod of gapingvoid.com - Co-creator with Alan Gilbey
 So Many Santas - TV Short

Music composer
 PJ Masks - theme music composer

Miscellaneous
 Lucky Fred - voice director for Disney Channel
 Bob and Margaret - script consultant: one episode for Channel 4, Comedy Central and Nelvana

References

External links
 Personal Homepage
  The Internet Movie Database entry for David Max Freedman
 Pitch Inc. Collaboration
 Evri Profile
 Toon Hound Series Listing
 Cult TV Listing
 Studio Ghibli - Consultant to Producer

Living people
1965 births
American male writers
American television writers
Television producers from New York City
American television directors
American male screenwriters
American male television writers
American voice directors
Writers from New York City
American emigrants to England
People from Plattsburgh, New York
Screenwriters from New York (state)